The Roscio Municipality is one of the 11 municipalities (municipios) that makes up the Venezuelan state of Bolívar and, according to the 2011 census by the National Institute of Statistics of Venezuela, the municipality has a population of 21,750. The town of Guasipati is the shire town of the Roscio Municipality.

Demographics
The Roscio Municipality, according to a 2007 population estimate by the National Institute of Statistics of Venezuela, has a population of 23,957 (up from 19,777 in 2000). This amounts to 1.6% of the state's population.

Government
The mayor of the Roscio Municipality is Manuel de Jesús González Marrero, re-elected on October 31, 2004, with 51% of the vote.  The municipality is divided into one (two if you count the Capital Roscio section) parishes; Salom.

See also
Guasipati
Bolívar
Municipalities of Venezuela

References

Municipalities of Bolívar (state)